Triston Cole (born January 4, 1976) is an American politician who served as a member of the Michigan House of Representatives from 2015 to 2021.

Career
First elected in November 2014, Cole represented Antrim, Charlevoix, Montmorency, Oscoda, and Otsego counties in the northern part of the Lower Peninsula.

Prior to his election to the House, Cole was a hunting guide for 15 years. He and his wife Stacy also started a farm in Antrim County. Cole is also a former president of the Antrim County Farm Bureau and chairman of the county Republican Party.

Electoral history

2014

References

1976 births
21st-century American politicians
Farmers from Michigan
Living people
Republican Party members of the Michigan House of Representatives
People from Antrim County, Michigan
Place of birth missing (living people)
Ferris State University alumni